Badava Rascal is a 2021 Indian Kannada-language action comedy film written and directed by Shankar Guru, in his directorial debut and produced by Dhananjay in his first production venture, under Daali Pictures. Besides Dhananjay, the film stars Amrutha Iyengar, Rangayana Raghu, Nagabhushan and Tara in other pivotal roles. It was also released in Tamil and Telugu on 18 February 2022.

The film's plot is centered around a middle-class man who gets abducted by a gang and forces them to rethink their decisions by narrating his life story which consists of friendship, love, breakup, family sentiments and life lessons. Vasuki Vaibhav scored music for the film, while Preetha Jayaraman served as the director of photography and Niranjan Devaramane as editor.

Badava Rascal opened to positive reviews from critics upon theatrical release on 24 December 2021, the eve of Christmas holiday. They highlighted the performances of Dhananjay and Rangayana Raghu, the musical score by Vasuki Vaibhav, while directing criticism at the film's length.

Plot 
Shankar alias "Badava Rascal" is an MBA graduate who lives life on his own terms. He thrashes some goons who work for a moneylender named Ganapa, when they were wreaking havoc at a roadside eatery, but was knocked out by one of the goons and is taken to their hideout along with his friend Nagalinga alias Naga. However, Ganapa and the gang apologize to Shankar and Naga after they saved the gang from rival gang headed by Ganapa's friend Naveen alias "Down-to-Earth". The rival gang compromises with each other and share their life stories to Shankar. Shankar reveals about himself. He lives happily with his friends and parents Rangegowda, an auto driver and mother Sharadamma, and also falls for Sangeetha, who is the daughter of an MLA candidate Premakumari, who accepts the proposal. 

When Shankar and his parents arrive to meet Sangeetha, Sangeetha (who is at her room) insults Shankar and his parents for their lower class status where Shankar angrily leaves the house along with his parents. Shankar gets addicted to drinking due to their breakup. Days pass by, Shankar begins to learn about the value of his parents and becomes a better son to them. The goons are impressed by his life-story. Meanwhile, Ganapa and Down-to-Earth leave the hideout to meet their boss Manki Sudhi, where they learn that Premakumari actually warned Sangeetha to reject Shankar's proposal as she cannot kill him due to Elections. When Sangeetha refuses, Premakumari comes with a plan to pretend to accept the proposal, and barges into Sangeetha's room and cuts her hair. Shakened and fearing for Shankar's life as her mother will not spare him, Sangeetha rejects the proposal. 

Ganapa and Down-to-Earth sneak into Sangeetha's house where they hand her a phone and tells her that they will contact Shankar. Shankar gets enraged after learning about the incident.  Sangeetha calls Shankar and tells her to take her away from her mother, Shankar agrees and challenges Premakumari that he will marry Sangeetha in her presence. Ganapa, Down-to-Earth along with their gang accompany Shankar to a playground where Premakumari is performing rituals for the construction of a site. A fight erupts between Shankar and Premakumari's newly appointed henchmen in which Shankar emerges victorious and reunites with Sangeetha. Premakumari realizes her mistakes and peacefully leaves. Shankar and Sangeetha finally get married in the presence of their parents and friends.

Cast 
 Dhananjay as Shankar
 Amrutha Iyengar as Sangeetha
 Nagabhushan as Nagalinga, Shankar's friend 
 Rangayana Raghu as Rangegowda, Shankar's father
 Tara as Sharadamma, Shankar's mother
 Poornachandra Mysuru as Ganapa
 Sparsha Rekha as Premakumari, Sangeetha's mother
 Maasthi Manju
Suresha Venkatesh

Music 

Vasuki Vaibhav scored background music for the film and its soundtrack.

Accolades

References

External links 
 

2021 films
2021 romantic comedy films
2020s Kannada-language films
Indian black comedy films
Films shot in Bangalore